is a Japanese female professional ten-pin bowler. She is a member of the Japan Professional Bowling Association, license no. 389. She is currently a member of the Storm Products team.

Major accomplishments 
 2006 - Tokai Women's Open (winner)
 2006 - Ladies vs. Rookies (winner)
 2007 - 29th Eagle Classic (winner)
 2008 - Gunma Open (winner)
 2019 - LJBC Prince Cup (winner)

DHC
 DHC Ladies Bowling Tour 2005/06 - final leg (winner)

P★League
 Tournament 10 - winner

References

External links 
Profile @ P★League

1977 births
Living people
Sportspeople from Aichi Prefecture
Japanese ten-pin bowling players